William Amasa Scott (April 17, 1862 in Clarkson, New York–1944) was an American economist and one of the leading representatives of the marginalist school.

He received his B.A. from the University of Rochester in 1886, and his PhD under supervision of Richard T. Ely from Johns Hopkins University in 1892. Scott was a professor of Political Economy at the University of Wisconsin–Madison until 1931, and a contributor to John Kells Ingram’s A History of Political Economy.

Bibliography

References

External links
 

1862 births
1944 deaths
People from Clarkson, New York
Economists from New York (state)
University of Rochester alumni
Johns Hopkins University alumni
University of Wisconsin–Madison faculty